Manjur may refer to:
 Manjur (instrument), a musical instrument in the Arab states of the Persian Gulf
 Manjur, India, a village in Tamil Nadu state

See also
Manjoor (disambiguation)